Jemal Megrelishvili (born 28 February 1950) is a Soviet wrestler. He competed in the men's Greco-Roman 62 kg at the 1972 Summer Olympics and was affiliated with Dynamo Tbilisi.

References

External links
 

1950 births
Living people
Male sport wrestlers from Georgia (country)
Soviet male sport wrestlers
Olympic wrestlers of the Soviet Union
Wrestlers at the 1972 Summer Olympics
Dynamo sports society athletes
Place of birth missing (living people)